John Pavlovitz (born June 1, 1969) is an American former youth pastor and author, known for his progressive social and political writings from a liberal Christian  perspective.

Early life and education 
Pavlovitz was born in Syracuse, New York to a middle-class family of Italian and Russian Jewish descent, and was raised as a member of the Catholic Church. He studied graphic design at the University of the Arts in Philadelphia.

Ministry 
After college,  Pavlovitz joined a Methodist church, where he married his wife Jennifer. He attended Eastern Baptist Theological Seminary and became a youth minister at the church. Pavlovitz later worked for nearly a decade as youth pastor, in a program serving several hundred students at the Good Shepherd United Methodist Church, a "megachurch" in Charlotte, North Carolina before being fired. In 2022 he launched Empathetic People Network, a private paid social media network for "kind humans".

Writing 
Pavlovitz began a blog Stuff That Needs To Be Said in 2012, and was fired from a Raleigh, NC church in 2013, in response to "provocative" articles he'd posted. He later became a youth minister at North Raleigh Community Church.

His blog has gained a large following and media attention for articles he has written on the subjects of acceptance of homosexuality ("If I Have Gay Children", 2014), attitudes about rape ("To Brock Turner's Father, from Another Father", 2016), the presidential candidacy of Hillary Clinton ("Thank You, Hillary", 2016), and the character of Donald Trump ("It’s time we stopped calling Donald Trump a Christian", 2017).

In 2017, Westminster John Knox Press published his first book A Bigger Table: Building Messy, Authentic, and Hopeful Spiritual Community, which describes what he sees as the four foundations of the Christian church, and argues for creating a more inclusive society and church community. His second book Hope and Other Superpowers: A Life-Affirming, Love-Defending, Butt-Kicking, World-Saving Manifesto offers advice for individuals seeking to counter "the highly partisan cultural climate", and was published by Simon & Schuster in November 2018.

Personal life
Pavlovitz and his wife Jennifer have two children.

In October 2021, Pavlovitz underwent surgery to have a noncancerous pituitary tumor removed from the base of his brain.

References

External links
 John Pavlovitz's Official Website
 

1969 births
Living people
American people of Italian descent
American people of Russian-Jewish descent
American spiritual writers
Former Roman Catholics